Santa Maria della Carità (English: "St Mary (or, Our Lady) of Charity") may refer to:

Churches
Santa Maria della Carità, Bologna
Santa Maria della Carità, Brescia
Santa Maria della Carità, Mantua
Santa Maria della Carità, Naples
Santa Maria della Carità, Venice, part of the Scuola dell Carità complex, home of the Gallerie dell'Accademia
Scrovegni Chapel, Padua, Italy, dedicated to Santa Maria della Carità

Depictions
 The Stonemason's Yard, a painting by Giovanni Antonio Canal ("Canaletto")

See also

 Santa Maria la Carità, a comune in the Province of Naples, Italy